Grewia bulot (Vietnamese ) is a species of flowering plant in the family Malvaceae, native to southern Vietnam. It is an indicator species of the Highland Floodplain community, along with Michelia floribunda, Polyalthia cerasoides, Nephelium lappaceum and Machilus odoratissima.

References

bulot
Endemic flora of Vietnam
Plants described in 1943